The  (French) or  (Dutch) is a central boulevard in Brussels, Belgium, connecting the Place de Brouckère/De Brouckèreplein to the Place Fontainas/Fontainasplein. It was created following the covering of the river Senne (1867–1871), and bears the name of Jules Anspach, a former mayor of the City of Brussels.

The Boulevard Anspach is continued to the north by both the / and the Boulevard Adolphe Max/Adolphe Maxlaan, forming a "Y" crossroad at the Place de Brouckère. To the south, it crosses the Place de la Bourse/Beursplein about halfway through, and continues towards the Place Fontainas where it becomes the /.

Many places of interest lie along the Boulevard Anspach, for instance the former Brussels Stock Exchange, the Ancienne Belgique concert hall, the Pathé Palace cinema (officially named the Cinéma Palace since 2018), as well as numerous shops and restaurants. De Brouckère metro station on lines 1 and 5 of the Brussels Metro is accessible from the Boulevard Anspach, as well as Bourse/Beurs premetro (underground tram) station.

History

The Boulevard Anspach was built between 1868 and 1871, as part of the North–South Axis which was created after the covering of the river Senne, although the river no longer flows underneath it. Prior to 1879, it was named the / ("Central Boulevard"), when it was renamed in honour of Jules Anspach (1829–1879), the former mayor of the City of Brussels who instigated these works.

On 4 September 1944, the Boulevard Anspach was the scene of great jubilation during the liberation of Brussels by the British Guards Armoured Division. In 1976, as part of the North–South line, the premetro took the place of the river, which was then diverted along the Small Ring (Brussels' inner ring road).

In June 2012, "protest picnics" were held on the Boulevard Anspach to express dissatisfaction with the City of Brussels' mobility policy. Following these events, the city's then-mayor, Freddy Thielemans, decided to make the boulevard car-free every Sunday afternoon for the entire summer. His successor, Yvan Mayeur, wished to expand the Boulevard Anspach into a permanent pedestrian zone with a new street cover, equipped with fountains, works of art, benches and trees. On 29 June 2015, the boulevard finally became completely car-free between the Place de la Bourse/Beursplein and the Place de Brouckère/De Brouckèreplein as part of a broader pedestrianisation of Brussels' city centre.

Notable buildings
The Boulevard Anspach is home to many buildings in neoclassical, Beaux-Arts, Art Nouveau, Art Deco and eclectic styles. Some examples include:
It won the fifth prize in the architectural competition of 1876, and was demolished in 1967. 
It once housed the famous café Aux Armes des Brasseurs.
 No. 59–61: Eclectic apartment building (1872) by Gédéon Bordiau, decorated with caryatids by Julien Dillens
 No. 78: Neo-Baroque apartment building (1874) by 
 No. 85: Pathé Palace (1913), an Art Nouveau cinema by

See also

 List of streets in Brussels
 Neoclassical architecture in Belgium
 Art Nouveau in Brussels
 Art Deco in Brussels
 History of Brussels
 Belgium in "the long nineteenth century"

References

Notes

Bibliography
 
 
 

Anspach
City of Brussels
19th century in Brussels
Car-free zones in Europe